Zeynep Sevde (born 20 August 1983) is a Turkish writer and publisher.

Biography 
Zeynep Sevde studied physics in Yıldız Technical University and sociology in Boğaziçi University and Istanbul Bilgi University. Since 2001 she is working in the publishing sector as an editor, writer and translator. She is famous for her picturebooks and non-fiction books for children. Her books have been also published in Arabic, Macedonian, English, Chinese and Korean. She owns a publishing house called Taze Kitap which publishes children books.

Books 
 Kaplumbağa Battuta Günlükleri-İstanbul'da Bir Gün (Turtle Battuta Diaries), Profil Çocuk Yayınları (2015)
 Uyuyamayan Koala (Sleepless Koala), Taze Kitap (2015)
 Bay Ka Buk ve Ejder (Mr Eggsh Ell and the Dragon), Taze Kitap (2016)
 Yeşil Günlük (Green Diary), Taze Kitap (2016)
 Hayvan Atlası (Animal Atlas), Taze Kitap (2016)
 Kafası Değişikler Atlası (Atlas of Different Minds), Taze Kitap (2017)
 Dünyanın Öbür Ucunda Ne Var (What is There on the Other Side of the World), Taze Kitap (2018)
 Dünyanın Öbür Ucunda Kim Var (Who is There on the Other Side of the World), Taze Kitap (2022)

References

1983 births
Living people
Turkish children's writers
Turkish women children's writers
21st-century Turkish women writers
Turkish publishers (people)
Yıldız Technical University alumni